Szewczyk is a Polish occupational surname, derived from the occupation of szewc ("shoemaker"). It is related to the Czech name Ševčík and Ukrainian surname Shevchik (Шевчик) and Shevchuk (Шевчук).

It may refer to:
 Jerzy Luczak-Szewczyk (1923–1975), Polish-Swedish artist
 Maciej Szewczyk, Polish footballer
 Małgorzata Szewczyk (1828–1905), Polish nun
 Roman Szewczyk (born 1965), Polish footballer
 Szymon Szewczyk (born 1982), Polish basketball player
 Wilhelm Szewczyk (1916–1991), Polish writer
 Zbigniew Szewczyk (born 1967), Polish footballer

See also
 

Occupational surnames
Polish-language surnames